Greg Hunter (born 1965 in Hammersmith, London) is an English composer and sound engineer. He attended Goldsmiths, University of London. He is known for his work with The Orb and with producer Youth in their collaboration to form Dub Trees, and as a composer of electronic / world music.  His work with Youth includes the remix and production on Suns of Arqa's album Jaggernaut Whirling Dub released in 1992.

Though Hunter is frequently uncredited, he has worked on a wide variety of albums and also for the film industry including the sequels The Matrix Reloaded and The Matrix Revolutions.

He has a small but devoted fan-base thanks to his attention to detail and a stylistic quality that is widely recognizable. Primary examples of his work would include the seminal Subsurfing album Frozen Ants and his world music collaborations such as Alien Soap Opera, Fifth Sun and Lotus Blossom.

Since 2000 he has been releasing music as Dubsahara.

In 2014 he started his record label Mutantra Records.

References

English audio engineers
English composers
1965 births
Living people
People from Hammersmith
Alumni of Goldsmiths, University of London